The structure of the British Army is being reorganised to the Future Soldier structure. The Army is commanded by the Chief of the General Staff (CGS), with Army Headquarters which is located in Andover, Hampshire.  Subordinate to that post, there is a Commander Field Army, and a personnel and UK operations command, Home Command.

Introduction
The command structure within the British Army is hierarchical; with divisions and brigades controlling groupings of units from an administrative perspective.  Major units are battalion-sized, with minor units being company sized sub-units.  In some Regiments and Corps called squadrons or batteries, sub-divided into platoons or troops.  All units within the British Army service are either Regular (full-time) or Army Reserve (full-time or part-time), or a combination with sub-units of each type.

Naming conventions of units differ for traditional British historical reasons, creating a significant opportunity for confusion; an infantry battalion is equivalent to a cavalry regiment.  An infantry regiment is an administrative and ceremonial organisation only, and may include several battalions.  For operational tasks, a battle group will be formed around a combat unit, supported by units or sub-units from other areas.  An example would be a squadron of tanks attached to an armoured infantry battle group, together with a reconnaissance troop, artillery battery, and engineering support.

Since the 1957 Defence White Paper which re-roled British forces in Germany in favour of nuclear weapons and the end of National Service, the size of the British Army has consistently shrunk.  Since 1990, reductions have been almost constant, through succeeding defence reviews: Options for Change (1990), Front Line First (1994), the Strategic Defence Review of 1998, Delivering Security in a Changing World (2003), the Army 2020 Restructuring (2010), the Army 2020 Refine (2015), and Defence in a Competitive Age (2021).

The British military (those parts of the British Armed Forces tasked with land warfare, as opposed to the naval forces) historically was divided into a number of 'forces', of which the British Army (also referred to historically as the 'Regular Army' and the 'Regular Force') was only one.  The oldest of these organisations was the Militia Force (also referred to as the 'Constitutional Force'), whereby the Reserve Forces units mostly lost their own identities, and became numbered Territorial Force sub-units of regular British Army corps or regiments (the Home Militia had followed this path, with the Militia Infantry units becoming numbered battalions of British Army regiments, and the Militia Artillery integrating within Royal Artillery territorial divisions in 1882 and 1889, and becoming parts of the Royal Field Artillery or Royal Garrison Artillery in 1902 (though retaining their traditional corps names), but was not merged into the Territorial Force when it was created in 1908 (by the merger of the Yeomanry and Volunteer Force).  The Militia was instead renamed the 'Special Reserve', and was permanently suspended after the First World War (although a handful of Militia units survived in the United Kingdom, its colonies, and the Crown Dependencies).  Unlike the Home, Imperial Fortress, and Crown Dependency Militia and Volunteer units and forces that continued to exist after the First World War, although parts of the British military, most were not considered parts of the British Army unless they received Army Funds (as was the case for the Bermuda Militia Artillery and the Bermuda Volunteer Rifle Corps), which was generally only the case for those in the Channel Islands or the Imperial Fortress colonies: Nova Scotia (before Canadian confederation), Bermuda, Gibraltar, and Malta).

Army Headquarters
Through a major army reorganisation, effective 1 November 2011, the Chief of the General Staff took direct command of the Army through a new structure, based at Andover and known as 'Army Headquarters'.

Reporting to the Chief of the General Staff are four lieutenant-generals: the Deputy Chief of the General Staff (DCGS), the Commander Field Army (CFA), the Commander Home Command (CHC), and Commander Allied Rapid Reaction Corps (CARRC).  The CFA is responsible for generating and preparing forces for current and contingency operations; he commands 1st (United Kingdom) Division, 3rd (United Kingdom) Division, 6th (United Kingdom) Division, and Joint Helicopter Command (JHC).  CHC is responsible for commanding a wide variety of organisations that both contribute to the administrative running of the Army (i.e. the Army Personnel Centre (APC) in Glasgow), and focuses on the 'home base' (i.e. Regional Command).

Commander Allied Rapid Reaction Corps

104 Theatre Sustainment Brigade 
104 Theatre Sustainment Brigade, at Duke of Gloucester Barracks, South Cerney
2 Operational Support Group, Royal Logistic Corps, at Prince William of Gloucester Barracks, Grantham (Specialist Support Group)
9 Supply Regiment, Royal Logistic Corps, at Buckley Barracks, Chippenham (Theatre Logistic Regiment)
17 Port and Maritime Regiment, Royal Logistic Corps, at Marchwood Military Port, Marchwood (Port and Maritime Support Regiment)
29 Postal Courier and Movement Regiment, Royal Logistic Corps, at Duke of Gloucester Barracks, South Cerney (Postal Courier and Movement Control Regiment)
152 (North Irish) Regiment, Royal Logistic Corps, at Palace Barracks, Holywood (Fuel Storage and Transport Regiment) (Army Reserve)
162 Postal Courier and Movement Regiment, Royal Logistic Corps, at Nottingham (Movement Control Regiment) (Army Reserve – paired with 29 Regiment, RLC)
165 (Wessex) Port and Enabling Regiment, Royal Logistic Corps, at Plymouth (Port and Maritime Support Regiment) (Army Reserve – paired with 17 Regiment, RLC)
167 Catering Support Regiment, Royal Logistic Corps, at Prince William of Gloucester Barracks, Grantham (Catering Support) (Army Reserve)
5 Force Support Battalion, Royal Electrical and Mechanical Engineers, at MoD Lyneham (Force Maintenance Support Battalion)

1st Signal Brigade 
1st Signal Brigade, at Imjin Barracks, Innsworth
299 Signal Squadron (Special Communications),  supports Other Government Departments in the UK and overseas, Bletchley
22 Signal Regiment, Royal Corps of Signals, at Beacon Barracks, Stafford (supports NATO's Allied Rapid Reaction Corps HQ)
30 Signal Regiment, Royal Corps of Signals, at Gamecock Barracks, Bramcote (supports the PJHQ's deployable Joint Force Headquarters, Very High Readiness Field Hospital, the Air Assault Task Force and Joint Helicopter Command) (to move to Beacon Barracks, Stafford)
Gurkha ARRC Support Battalion, at Imjin Barracks, Innsworth (supports NATO's Allied Rapid Reaction Corps)
ARRC Military Police Battalion, at Worthy Down Camp, Winchester (Army Reserve) (supports NATO's Allied Rapid Reaction Corps)

Field Army

The units under Field Army are:
Reaction forces: comprising 16 Air Assault Brigade (16 AAB), and 3rd (United Kingdom) Division of two armoured infantry brigades (the 12th and 20th Armoured Infantry Brigades), and a Strike Brigade and along with combat support units.  3rd (UK) Division is operationally affiliated with the Allied Rapid Reaction Corps (ARRC).
Adaptive forces: comprising a 1st (United Kingdom) Division brigades.
6th (UK) Division: headquartered at Trenchard Lines, Upavon Station in Wiltshire, 6th (United Kingdom) Division comprising surveillance, intelligence, reconnaissance, communications, electronic warfare, psychological operations.
Joint Helicopter Command: which commands most of the UK's battlefield lift and attack helicopters for the Royal Navy, British Army, and Royal Air Force.

Field Army gained initial operating capability (IOC) on 30 November 2015, and was formed as a result of the 2015 Army Command Review.  The Commander Field Army commands all the formations of the British Army's forces for operational tasks, its collective training, and tactical doctrine organisations, and includes the vast majority of the Army’s fighting equipment.

Commander Collective Training Group
British Army Training Unit Kenya (BATUK), at Nyati Barracks, Nanyuki, Kenya
Archer's Post Training Area
Dol Dol Training Area
International Mine Action Training Centre
Peace Training Support Centre
Land Warfare Centre (LWC), at Waterloo Lines, Warminster, Wiltshire
Gurkha Company (Tavoleto), training support unit for the LWC
2nd Battalion, Yorkshire Regiment (14th/15th, 19th and 33rd/76th Foot) at Dale Barracks, Chester (Infantry Trials and Demonstration Battalion)
Royal School of Artillery, at Royal Artillery Barracks, Larkhill Garrison, Wiltshire
14 Regiment Royal Artillery

1st (United Kingdom) Division

1st (United Kingdom) Division, in York (Adaptable Force)

4th Light Brigade Combat Team 
4th Light Brigade Combat Team, at Bourlon Barracks, Catterick Garrison
Light Dragoons, at Gaza Barracks, Catterick Garrison (Light Cavalry)
1st Battalion, Grenadier Guards, at Lille Barracks, Aldershot Garrison (Light Infantry)
1st Battalion, Coldstream Guards at Victoria Barracks, Windsor (Light Infantry)
2nd Battalion, Mercian Regiment (Cheshires, Worcesters & Foresters, and Staffords), at Weeton Barracks, Blackpool (Light Mechanised Infantry)
Royal Highland Fusiliers, 2nd Battalion, Royal Regiment of Scotland, at Glencorse Barracks, Penicuik (Light Infantry)
2nd Battalion, The Rifles, at Thiepval Barracks, Lisburn (Light Infantry)
103 (Lancashire Artillery Volunteers) Regiment, Royal Artillery, in St Helens (Light Fires)

7th Light Mechanised Brigade Combat Team 
7th Light Mechanised Brigade Combat Team, at Kendrew Barracks, Cottesmore
Royal Scots Dragoon Guards (Carabiniers and Greys), at Waterloo Lines, Leuchars Station (Light Cavalry)
2nd Battalion, Royal Anglian Regiment, at Kendrew Barracks, Cottesmore (Light Mechanised Infantry)
1st Battalion, The Rifles, at Beachley Barracks, Chepstow (Light Infantry, to re-role by 2023)
1st Battalion, Princess of Wales's Royal Regiment (Queen's and Royal Hampshires) (Light Mechanised Infantry)
The Highlanders, 4th Battalion, Royal Regiment of Scotland, at Bourlon Barracks, Catterick Garrison (Light Mechanised Infantry)
1st Battalion, Yorkshire Regiment (14th/15th, 19th and 33rd/76th Foot), at Somme Barracks, Catterick Garrison (Armoured Infantry, re-rolling to Light Mechanised Infantry)
4th Regiment Royal Artillery, at Alanbrooke Barracks, Topcliffe (Light Fires)
105 Regiment, Royal Artillery, in Edinburgh (Army Reserve Light Fires)
32 Engineer Regiment, Royal Engineers, at Catterick Garrison (Close Support Engineers)

11th Security Force Assistance Brigade 
11th Security Force Assistance Brigade, at Aldershot Garrison
1st Battalion, Irish Guards at Mons Barracks, Aldershot Garrison (Security Force Assistance)
Black Watch, 3rd Battalion, Royal Regiment of Scotland, at Fort George, Inverness (Light Mechanised Infantry, to re-role to Security Force Assistance by 2025)
4th Battalion, Princess of Wales's Royal Regiment (Queen's and Royal Hampshires), in Redhill (Army Reserve Light Infantry)
Outreach Group, in Hermitage (Outreach and Cultural Support)

19th Brigade 

 19th Brigade, at Imphal Barracks, York
 Queen's Own Yeomanry, at Fenham Barracks, Newcastle upon Tyne (Army Reserve Light Cavalry) — paired with the Light Dragoons
 Scottish and North Irish Yeomanry, at Redford Barracks, Edinburgh  (Army Reserve Light Cavalry) – paired with Royal Scots Dragoon Guards
 2nd Battalion, Royal Irish Regiment (27th (Inniskilling), 83rd, 87th and Ulster Defence Regiment), at Thiepval Barracks, Lisburn (Army Reserve Light Infantry) — unknown pairing. 
 3rd Battalion, Royal Anglian Regiment, in Bury St Edmunds (Army Reserve Light Infantry) — paired with 2 R ANGLIAN
 4th Battalion, Yorkshire Regiment (14th/15th, 19th and 33rd/76th Foot), at Worsley Barracks, York (Army Reserve Light Infantry) — paired with 2 MERCIAN
 52nd Lowland Volunteers, 6th Battalion, Royal Regiment of Scotland, at Walcheren Barracks, Glasgow (Army Reserve Light Infantry) — paired with 2 SCOTS
4th Battalion, Duke of Lancaster's Regiment (King's, Lancashire and Border), at Kimberley Barracks, Preston (Army Reserve Light Infantry) — paired with 1 LANCS
 51st Highland Volunteers, 7th Battalion, Royal Regiment of Scotland at Queen's Barracks, Perth (Army Reserve Light Infantry) – paired with 3 SCOTS
 6th Battalion, The Rifles, at Wyvern Barracks, Exeter (Army Reserve Light Infantry) — paired with 1 RIFLES
 8th Battalion, The Rifles in Bishop Auckland (Army Reserve Light Infantry) – paired with 3 RIFLES

8 Engineer Brigade 
 8 Engineer Brigade, at Gibraltar Barracks, Minley
Central Volunteer Headquarters, Royal Engineers, at Gibraltar Barracks, Minley
12 (Force Support) Engineer Group at RAF Wittering
28 Engineer Regiment, Royal Engineers, at Rock Barracks, Woodbridge and RAF Honington – NRBC defence
36 Engineer Regiment, Royal Engineers, at Invicta Park Barracks, Maidstone
39 Engineer Regiment, Royal Engineers, at Kinloss Barracks, Kinloss – Air support
71 Engineer Regiment, Royal Engineers, at Leuchars Station, Fife (Army Reserve - paired with 39 Engineer Regiment)
75 Engineer Regiment, Royal Engineers, at Peninsula Barracks, Warrington (Army Reserve - paired with 36 Engineer Regiment)
29 (Explosive Ordnance Disposal and Search) Group at Montgomery House, Aldershot Garrison
11 Explosive Ordnance Disposal and Search Regiment, Royal Logistic Corps at Vauxhall Barracks, Didcot
33 Engineer Regiment (EOD), Royal Engineers at Carver Barracks, Wimbish
35 Engineer Regiment, Royal Engineers at Swinton Barracks, Perham Down - Unit will be an EOD Regiment based at Carver Barracks, Wimbish
101 (City of London) Engineer Regiment (EOD&S), Royal Engineers in Catford (Army Reserve)
1st Military Working Dog Regiment, Royal Army Veterinary Corps at St George's Barracks, North Luffenham
170 (Infrastructure Support) Engineer Group at Chetwynd Barracks, Chilwell (to move to Gamecock Barracks, Bramcote
20 Works Group Royal Engineers (Air Support) at RAF Wittering (STREs based at other RAF bases)
62 Works Group Royal Engineers at Chetwynd Barracks, Chilwell
63 Works Group Royal Engineers at Chetwynd Barracks, Chilwell
65 Works Group Royal Engineers at Chetwynd Barracks, Chilwell (Army Reserve)
66 Works Group Royal Engineers at Chetwynd Barracks, Chilwell

102 Operational Sustainment Brigade
102 Operational Sustainment Brigade, at Prince William of Gloucester Barracks, Grantham, 
6 Regiment, Royal Logistic Corps, at Dishforth Airfield, North Yorkshire
7 Regiment, Royal Logistic Corps, at Kendrew Barracks, Cottesmore
150 (Yorkshire) Regiment, Royal Logistic Corps at Londesborough Barracks, Kingston upon Hull (Army Reserve)
158 (Royal Anglian) Regiment, Royal Logistic Corps in Peterborough (Army Reserve – paired with 7 Regiment RLC)
159 Regiment, Royal Logistic Corps in Coventry (Army Reserve – paired with 6 Regiment RLC)
3 Medical Regiment, Royal Army Medical Corps, at Fulwood Barracks, Preston
225 (Scottish) Medical Regiment, Royal Army Medical Corps, in Dundee (Army Reserve)
253 (North Irish) Medical Regiment, Royal Army Medical Corps, in Belfast (Army Reserve)
254 (East of England) Medical Regiment, Royal Army Medical Corps in Cambridge (Army Reserve)
1 Close Support Battalion, Royal Electrical and Mechanical Engineers, at Munster Barracks, Catterick Garrison
2 Close Support Battalion, Royal Electrical and Mechanical Engineers, at Leuchars Station, Fife
102 Force Support Battalion, Royal Electrical and Mechanical Engineers, in Newton Aycliffe (Army Reserve)
103 Force Support Battalion, Royal Electrical and Mechanical Engineers, in Northampton (Army Reserve)

2nd Medical Brigade
2nd Medical Brigade, at Queen Elizabeth Barracks, Strensall (to move to Gamecock Barracks, Bramcote)
Medical Operational Support Group
Central Reserve Headquarters, Army Medical Services, at Queen Elizabeth Barracks, Strensall
306 Hospital Support Regiment, Royal Army Medical Corps, in York (Army Reserve)
335 Medical Evacuation Regiment, Royal Army Medical Corps, at Queen Elizabeth Barracks, Strensall (paired with 1, 4 and 5 Armoured Medical Regiments)
22 Field Hospital, Royal Army Medical Corps, at Keogh Barracks, Mytchett
34 Field Hospital, Royal Army Medical Corps, at Queen Elizabeth Barracks, Strensall (to move to Gamecock Barracks, Bramcote)
201 (Northern) Field Hospital, Royal Army Medical Corps, in Newcastle upon Tyne (Army Reserve)
202 (Midlands) Field Hospital, Royal Army Medical Corps, in Birmingham (Army Reserve)
203 (Welsh) Field Hospital, Royal Army Medical Corps, in Cardiff (Army Reserve)
204 (North Irish) Field Hospital, Royal Army Medical Corps, in Belfast (Army Reserve)
205 (Scottish) Field Hospital, Royal Army Medical Corps, in Glasgow (Army Reserve)
207 (Manchester) Field Hospital, Royal Army Medical Corps, in Manchester (Army Reserve)
208 (Liverpool) Field Hospital, Royal Army Medical Corps, in Liverpool (Army Reserve)
212 (Yorkshire) Field Hospital, Royal Army Medical Corps, in Sheffield (Army Reserve)
243 (The Wessex) Field Hospital, Royal Army Medical Corps, in Keynsham (Army Reserve)
256 (City of London) Field Hospital, Royal Army Medical Corps, in Walworth (Army Reserve)

1st Military Police Brigade 
 1st Military Police Brigade at Marlborough Lines, Andover CGS retains full responsibility over military police investigations while day-to-day control of 1 and 3 RMP rest with General Officer Commanding (GOC) 3rd UK Division. Administrative control of other Royal Military Police Brigade units rest under GOC Regional Command.
 Special Investigation Branch Regiment (SIB Regt), at Bulford Camp
 Specialist Operations Regiment Royal Military Police
 Military Corrective Training Centre, at Colchester Garrison

3rd (United Kingdom) Division

Division referred to as the 'Reaction Force'
3rd (United Kingdom) Division, at Bulford Camp (Reaction Forces)
 Pre-Hospital Care Group (from 2 Medical Brigade)

1st Deep Recce Strike Brigade Combat Team 
1st Deep Recce Strike Brigade Combat Team, at Tidworth Garrison
National Reserve Headquarters, Royal Artillery, at Royal Artillery Barracks, Woolwich (controlling the Watchkeeper pool and providing specialist batteries/troops) (Army Reserve)
Household Cavalry Regiment, at Bulford Camp (Armoured Cavalry)
Royal Lancers (Queen Elizabeth's Own), at Catterick Garrison (Armoured Cavalry)
1st The Queen's Dragoon Guards, at Robertson Barracks, Swanton Morley (Light Cavalry)
Royal Yeomanry, at Fulham House, London (Army Reserve Light Cavalry) — paired with QDG
1st Regiment, Royal Horse Artillery, at Assaye Barracks, Larkhill Garrison  (Armoured Fires)
3rd Regiment, Royal Horse Artillery, at Albemarle Barracks, Stamfordham (Light Fires re-rolling to Deep Fires in 2024)
5 Regiment, Royal Artillery, at Marne Barracks, Catterick Garrison (Surveillance and Target Acquisition Regiment)
19 Regiment Royal Artillery, at Bhurtpore Barracks, Tidworth Garrison  (Armoured Fires)
26 Regiment Royal Artillery, at Purvis Lines, Larkhill Garrison (Deep Fires)
101 (Northumbrian) Regiment Royal Artillery, in Gateshead (Army Reserve Deep Fires)
104 Regiment Royal Artillery, at Raglan Barracks, Newport  (Army Reserve Light Fires)
6 Armoured Close Support Battalion, Royal Electrical and Mechanical Engineers, at Delhi Barracks, Tidworth Garrison

12th Armoured Brigade Combat Team 
12th Armoured Brigade Combat Team, at Bulford Camp
King's Royal Hussars, at Tidworth Garrison (Armoured Regiment, become an Armoured Cavalry Regiment in 2025)
Royal Tank Regiment, at Tidworth Garrison  (Armoured Regiment)
Royal Wessex Yeomanry, in Bovington (Army Reserve – Challenger 2 crew replacement for the RTR, QRH, and KRH)
1st Battalion, Mercian Regiment (Cheshires, Worcesters & Foresters, and Staffords), at Bulford Camp (Armoured Infantry)
1st Battalion, Royal Welsh, at Tidworth Garrison (Armoured Infantry)
3rd Battalion, The Rifles, at Redford Barracks, Edinburgh (to re-role to Security Force Assistance and join 11 Brigade by 2025)
4th Battalion, Mercian Regiment (Cheshires, Worcesters & Foresters, and Staffords), in Wolverhampton (Army Reserve Light Infantry)
3rd Battalion, Royal Welsh, in Cardiff (Army Reserve Light Infantry)
4 Regiment, Royal Logistic Corps, at Dalton Barracks, Abingdon-on-Thames
4th Armoured Medical Regiment, Royal Army Medical Corps, at Normandy Barracks, Aldershot Garrison (To be re-designated and restructured to 2 Medical Regiment by May 2023)
4 Armoured Close Support Battalion, Royal Electrical and Mechanical Engineers, at Jellalabad Barracks, Tidworth Garrison

20th Armoured Brigade Combat Team 
20th Armoured Brigade Combat Team, at Bulford Camp
Royal Dragoon Guards, at Battlesbury Barracks, Warminster, (Armoured Cavalry)
Queen's Royal Hussars (Queen's Own and Royal Irish), at Tidworth Garrison (Armoured Regiment)
1st Battalion, Royal Regiment of Fusiliers, at Tidworth Garrison (Armoured Infantry)
5th Battalion, The Rifles, at Bulford Camp, (Armoured Infantry)
1st Battalion, Scots Guards, at Mons Barracks, Aldershot Garrison, to move to Bourlon Barracks, Catterick Garrison in 2023 (Light Mechanised Infantry)
5th Battalion, Royal Regiment of Fusiliers, in Newcastle upon Tyne (Army Reserve Light Infantry)
7th Battalion, The Rifles, in Reading (Army Reserve Light Infantry)
3rd Battalion, Princess of Wales's Royal Regiment (Queen's and Royal Hampshires), in Canterbury (Army Reserve Light Infantry)
1 Regiment, Royal Logistic Corps, at St David's Barracks, Bicester
1st Armoured Medical Regiment, Royal Army Medical Corps, at Bhurtpore Barracks, Tidworth
3 Armoured Close Support Battalion, Royal Electrical and Mechanical Engineers, at Prince Philip Lines, Tidworth Garrison

7th Air Defence Group 
7 Air Defence Group, at Baker Barracks, Thorney Island, Thorney Island
12 Regiment Royal Artillery, at Baker Barracks, Thorney Island (Equipped with Starstreak LML and Stormer HVM)
16 Regiment Royal Artillery,  at Baker Barracks, Thorney Island (Equipped with Sky Sabre)
106 (Yeomanry) Regiment, Royal Artillery, in London (Army Reserve, Equipped with Starstreak LML)

25 (Close Support) Engineer Group 
25 (Close Support) Engineer Group, at Picton Barracks, Bulford Camp
22 Engineer Regiment, Royal Engineers, in Swinton Barracks, Perham Down (Armoured Close Support Regiment, in support of 12th Amd BCT)
26 Engineer Regiment, Royal Engineers, in Swinton Barracks, Perham Down (Armoured Close Support Regiment, in support of 20th Amd BCT)
21 Engineer Regiment, Royal Engineers, in Claro Barracks, Ripon, to move to Marne Barracks, Catterick Garrison by 2023
Royal Monmouthshire Royal Engineers (Militia), in Monmouth

101 Operational Sustainment Brigade 
101 Operational Sustainment Brigade, at St Omer Barracks, Aldershot Garrison
3 Regiment, Royal Logistic Corps, at Dalton Barracks, Abingdon-on-Thames
10 Queen's Own Gurkha Logistic Regiment, Royal Logistic Corps, at Gale Barracks, Aldershot Garrison
27 Regiment, Royal Logistic Corps, at Travers Barracks, Aldershot Garrison
151 (Greater London) Regiment, Royal Logistic Corps, in Croydon (Army Reserve – paired with 10 QOGLR)
154 (Scottish) Regiment, Royal Logistic Corps, in Dunfermline (Army Reserve – Paired with 27 Regiment RLC)
156 (North West) Regiment, Royal Logistic Corps, in Liverpool (Army Reserve – paired with 27 Regiment RLC, provides reserve augmentation to the brigade's regular RLC units)
157 (Welsh) Regiment, Royal Logistic Corps, in Lancaster (Army Reserve – paired with 9 Theatre Logistic Regiment)
101 Force Support Battalion, Royal Electrical and Mechanical Engineers, in Keynsham (Army Reserve)
5th Medical Regiment, Royal Army Medical Corps, at Gaza Barracks, Catterick Garrison
1 Regiment, Royal Military Police, at Catterick Garrison
3 Regiment, Royal Military Police, at Bulford Camp

11th Signal Brigade and Headquarters West Midlands 
11th Signal Brigade and Headquarters West Midlands, at Venning Barracks, Donnington
Central Volunteer Headquarters, Royal Corps of Signals, at Venning Barracks, Donnington
10 Signal Regiment, Royal Corps of Signals, at MoD Corsham, Corsham
32 (Scottish) Signal Regiment, Royal Corps of Signals, in Glasgow (Army Reserve – paired with 16 Signal Regiment)
39 (Skinners) Signal Regiment, Royal Corps of Signals, in Bristol (Army Reserve – paired with 22 Signal Regiment)
7 Signal Group, at Venning Barracks, Donnington (to move to Kiwi Barracks, Bulford Camp)
1 Signal Regiment, Royal Corps of Signals, at Beacon Barracks, Stafford (to move to Swinton Barracks, Perham Down to support 20th Armoured Infantry Brigade)
2 Signal Regiment, Royal Corps of Signals, at Imphal Barracks, York (to move to Catterick Garrison in 2020/21 to provide support to the Strike Experimentation Group)
15 Signal Regiment, Royal Corps of Signals, at Blandford Camp (to move to Swinton Barracks, Perham Down to support 12th Armoured Infantry Brigade)
37 Signal Regiment, Royal Corps of Signals, in Redditch (Army Reserve – paired with 10 Signal Regiment)
71 (City of London) Yeomanry Signal Regiment, Royal Corps of Signals, in Bexleyheath (Army Reserve – paired with 3 Signal Regiment)

6th (United Kingdom) Division
Headquarters, 6th (United Kingdom) Division, at Trenchard Lines, Upavon Station, Wiltshire

Army Special Operations Brigade 
Army Special Operations Brigade, at St Omer Barracks, Aldershot Garrison
255 Signal Squadron, Royal Corps of Signals, at Swinton Barracks, Perham Down
1st Battalion, Ranger Regiment, at Palace Barracks, Holywood
2nd Battalion, Ranger Regiment, at Keogh Barracks, Mytchett
3rd Battalion, Ranger Regiment, at Elizabeth Barracks, Pirbright Camp
4th Battalion, Ranger Regiment, at New Normandy Barracks, Aldershot Garrison
1 Squadron, Honourable Artillery Company (surveillance and reconnaissance patrols), at Armoury House, Finsbury (Army Reserve - under Honourable Artillery Company for Admin)

77th Brigade 
 77th Brigade, at Denison Barracks, Hermitage
Engineer and Logistic Staff Corps
Defence Cultural Specialist Unit
Task Group
Digital Operations Group
Operational Media and Communications Group
Honourable Artillery Company, at Armoury House, Finsbury (Army Reserve surveillance and target acquisition unit)

Field Army Troops

16 Air Assault Brigade 
16 Air Assault Brigade, at Merville Barracks, Colchester Garrison (Reaction Force)
216 Parachute Signal Squadron at Merville Barracks, Colchester Garrison
226 Signal Squadron at Cawdor Barracks, Pembrokeshire (under 14 Signal Regiment for Admin)
The Pathfinder Platoon
1st Battalion, Royal Irish Regiment (27th (Inniskilling), 83rd, 87th and Ulster Defence Regiment), at Clive Barracks, Ternhill
2nd Battalion, Parachute Regiment at Merville Barracks, Colchester Garrison
3rd Battalion, Parachute Regiment at Merville Barracks, Colchester Garrison
4th Battalion, Parachute Regiment, in Leeds (Army Reserve)
1st Battalion, Royal Gurkha Rifles, at Sir John Moore Barracks, Shorncliffe
53 (Louisburg) Air Assault Battery, Royal Artillery (STA) (under 5 Regiment, Royal Artillery for Admin)
7 Parachute Regiment, Royal Horse Artillery, (Light Artillery) at Merville Barracks, Colchester Garrison
A (1st City of London) Battery, Honourable Artillery Company (Light Artillery), at Armoury House, Finsbury (Army Reserve - under Honourable Artillery Company for Admin)
12 (Minden) Battery, Royal Artillery, at Baker Barracks, Thorney Island (LAD) (under 12 Regiment, Royal Artillery for Admin)
21 (Gibraltar 1779-83) Air Assault Battery, Royal Artillery, at Roberts Barracks, Larkhill Garrison (UAS) (under 32 Regiment Royal Artillery for Admin)
23 Parachute Engineer Regiment, Royal Engineers at Rock Barracks, Woodbridge
13 Air Assault Support Regiment, Royal Logistic Corps at Merville Barracks, Colchester Garrison
16 Medical Regiment, Royal Army Medical Corps at Merville Barracks, Colchester Garrison
156 Provost Company, Royal Military Police at Reed Hall Lines, Colchester Garrison (under 3 Regiment RMP for Admin)

Cyber and Electro Magnetic Activities Effects Group 

 Cyber and Electro Magnetic Activities Effects Group, in Andover
 13 Signal Regiment, Royal Corps of Signals, in Blandford (Cyber, Tri-Service unit; will move to Corsham by 2028)
 14 Signal Regiment, Royal Corps of Signals, in Brawdy (Electronic Warfare; will move to Innsworth by 2028)
 21 Signal Regiment, Royal Corps of Signals, in Colerne (Electronic Warfare; will move to Innsworth by 2028)

Surveillance Group 

 Surveillance Group
 32 Regiment, Royal Artillery, at Roberts Barracks, Larkhill Garrison, with Desert Hawk III

Understand Group 

 Understand Group
 Land Intelligence Fusion Centre, at Denison Barracks Hermitage
Specialist Group Military Intelligence, at Denison Barracks, Hermitage
2 Military Intelligence Battalion, Intelligence Corps, at Trenchard Lines, Upavon
3 Military Intelligence Battalion, Intelligence Corps, in London (Army Reserve – paired with 1 Military Intelligence Battalion)

1st Intelligence Surveillance and Reconnaissance Brigade 
1st Intelligence, Surveillance and Reconnaissance Brigade, at Trenchard Lines, Upavon
1 Military Intelligence Battalion, Intelligence Corps, at Bourlon Barracks, Catterick Garrison
4 Military Intelligence Battalion, Intelligence Corps, at Ward Barracks, Bulford Camp, supporting 3 (UK) Division
5 Military Intelligence Battalion, Intelligence Corps, in Edinburgh (Army Reserve – paired with 1 Military Intelligence Battalion)
6 Military Intelligence Battalion, Intelligence Corps, in Manchester (Army Reserve – paired with 2 Military Intelligence Battalion)
7 Military Intelligence Battalion, Intelligence Corps, in Bristol (Army Reserve – paired with 4 Military Intelligence Battalion)
Weapons Material and Personnel Exploitation Capacity, at Denison Barracks, Hermitage

Joint Helicopter Command 
Joint Helicopter Command, at AAC Middle Wallop (reports to Commander Field Army)
Watchkeeper Force
47 Regiment, Royal Artillery, at Horne Barracks, Larkhill Garrison, (Watchkeeper WK450)
Army Aviation Centre, at AAC Middle Wallop
2 (Training) Regiment, Army Air Corps (Ground Crew Training), at AAC Middle Wallop
7 (Training) Regiment, Army Air Corps (Flight Crew Training), at AAC Middle Wallop
Commando Helicopter Force, at RNAS Yeovilton
845 Naval Air Squadron, at RNAS Yeovilton, (Merlin HC4)
846 Naval Air Squadron, at RNAS Yeovilton, (Merlin HC4)
847 Naval Air Squadron, at RNAS Yeovilton, (Wildcat AH1)
Support Helicopter Force
No. 7 Squadron RAF, at RAF Odiham, (Chinook HC6)
No. 18 Squadron RAF, at RAF Odiham, (Chinook HC2)
No. 22 Squadron RAF, at RAF Benson, (JHC OEU)
No. 27 Squadron RAF, at RAF Odiham, (Chinook HC5/HC6)
No. 28 Squadron RAF, at RAF Benson, (OCU)
No. 33 Squadron RAF, at RAF Benson, (Puma HC2)
No. 230 Squadron RAF, at RAF Benson, (Puma HC2)
Joint Helicopter Support Squadron, at RAF Benson
Tactical Supply Wing RAF, at Beacon Barracks, Stafford

1st Aviation Brigade 
 1st Aviation Brigade, at AAC Middle Wallop
1st Regiment, Army Air Corps, at RNAS Yeovilton, (Wildcat AH1) 
3rd Regiment, Army Air Corps, at Wattisham Airfield, (AH64E)
4th Regiment, Army Air Corps, at Wattisham Airfield, (Apache AH.1)
5th Regiment, Army Air Corps, at JHCFS Aldergrove, (Westland Gazelle)
6th Regiment, Army Air Corps, in Bury St Edmunds
7th Aviation Support Battalion, Royal Electrical and Mechanical Engineers, at AAC Wattisham

Home Command 

Home Command consists of:
 Regional Command - to ensure delivery of a secure home front and forces and families in Brunei and Nepal. When not engaged with operational commitments or when units may report to the Standing Joint Commander (UK) or mission-specific training (e.g. when conducting routine civilian engagement, ranges, or ceremonial duties, units and formations may report through a Regional Point of Command (RPOC) to HQ Regional Command at Andover. Regional Command, as of 1 August 2019, has 38th (Irish) Brigade and 160th (Welsh) Brigade permanently under its command as RPOCs. Commander Regional Command is also Commander Army Cadet Force & Combined Cadet Force.
 London District - commands all the Army forces within the London area and conducts ceremonial events.
 Recruiting and Initial Training Command - recruits and trains soldiers.
 Army Personnel Centre - deals with personnel issues and liaises with outside agencies.
 Sandhurst Group - deals with applications of army officers Royal Military Academy Sandhurst.

Commander Home Command, is also the Standing Joint Commander (UK) for responsible for the planning and execution of civil contingency operations within the UK landmass and territorial waters.

Headquarters London District
Headquarters, London District at Horse Guards, City of Westminster
238 Signal Squadron, Royal Corps of Signals (provides all communications for London District, administered by 10 Signal Regiment)
Household Cavalry Mounted Regiment at Hyde Park Barracks, Knightsbridge
1st Battalion, Welsh Guards, at Combermere Barracks, Windsor 
1st Battalion, London Guards, in St John's Hill Drill Hall, Battersea (Army Reserve, administers army reserve companies of the Foot Guards Regiments)
Ypres Company, Grenadier Guards (Army Reserve Light Infantry)
Number 17 Company, Coldstream Guards (Army Reserve Light Infantry)
G (Messines) Company, Scots Guards (Army Reserve Light Infantry)
No 15 (Loos) Company, Irish Guards (Army Reserve Light Infantry)
 Public Duties Incremental Companies at Wellington Barracks
 Nijmegen Company, Grenadier Guards
 No. 7 Company, Coldstream Guards
 F Company, Scots Guards
 Number 9 Company Irish Guards 
 Number 12 Company Irish Guards
King's Troop Royal Horse Artillery at Royal Artillery Barracks, Woolwich with 13-pounder guns for ceremonial duties
20 Transport Squadron, Royal Logistic Corps at Regent's Park Barracks, Regent's Park, (provides all the transport needs for London District and the Royal Household)
Royal Military School of Music, at HMS Nelson, Portsmouth.
Mounted Band of the Household Cavalry, at Combermere Barracks, Windsor
Band of the Grenadier Guards, at Wellington Barracks
Band of the Coldstream Guards, at Wellington Barracks
Band of the Scots Guards, at Wellington Barracks
Band of the Irish Guards, at Wellington Barracks
Band of the Welsh Guards, at Wellington Barracks
Countess of Wessex's String Orchestra, at Royal Artillery Barracks, Woolwich

Headquarters Regional Command 
Headquarters Regional Command at Montgomery House, Aldershot is commanded by a Major-General. It is the Army's HQ for the UK, Nepal and Brunei, administering Army bases in the UK and providing civil engagement. . Headquarters Regional Command is also the operational command for the Army Cadets.

38th (Irish) Brigade 
 38th (Irish) Brigade, at Thiepval Barracks, Lisburn

51st Infantry Brigade and Headquarters Scotland 
51st Infantry Brigade and Headquarters Scotland, at Redford Barracks, Edinburgh
Balaklava Company, 5th Battalion, Royal Regiment of Scotland, at Redford Barracks, Edinburgh (Public duties)

160th (Welsh) Brigade 
160th (Welsh) Brigade, at The Barracks, Brecon
 Joint Services Mountain Training Centre, in Anglesey

Headquarters North East 
Headquarters North East, at Peronne Lines, Catterick Garrison

Headquarters East 

Headquarters East, at Chetwynd Barracks, Chilwell

Headquarters South East 
Headquarters South East, at Roebuck House, Aldershot Garrison

Headquarters North West 
 Headquarters North West, at Fulwood Barracks, Preston (previously 42 Infantry Brigade & HQ North West)

Headquarters South West 
 Headquarters South West, at Jellalabad Barracks, Tidworth Garrison (previously under 1 Artillery Brigade & HQ South West)

Headquarters West Midlands 
Headquarters West Midlands, at Beacon Barracks, Stafford

Army Recruiting and Initial Training Command 
Army Recruiting and Initial Training Command was established on 1 April 2018, and oversees the Army Recruiting Group, which includes the National Recruitment Centre (NRC) and local Army Careers Centres, and is staffed by a mixture of Capita staff and Army personnel.

Army Training Units (ATU) are commanded and staffed by UK Army Reservists. Along with Regular Army Training Regiments (ATR), they provide Basic Training to Army Reserve recruits, except those joining 4 PARA. Reserves recruits are selected at an Army Recruit Selection Centre. They then undertake a short basic training course known as ‘alpha', over four weekends or a residential week. The alpha course is followed by a 15.5-day residential 'bravo' course to achieve trained soldier status. These generic courses teach essential elements of the Regular Common Military Syllabus 2014 (CMS 14). Recruits will then attend Initial Trade Training courses as stipulated by their cap badge / Corps. The Honourable Artillery Company currently runs its own alpha course twice a year.  The current ATUs include:

Army Training Unit North, at Queen Elizabeth Barracks, Strensall and Altcar Training Camp
Army Training Unit Northern Ireland, at Ballykinler Training Centre
Army Training Unit Scotland, at Redford Barracks, Edinburgh
Army Training Unit West, at Wyvern Barracks, Exeter and Maindy Barracks, Cardiff

Army Personnel Centre 
The Centre is located in Glasgow. The APC's Chief Executive is the Military Secretary, who also holds the post of General Officer, Scotland. The APC deals with personnel issues and contact with outside agencies.

Royal Military Academy Sandhurst Group 
Commandant Sandhurst is a Major-General.

Royal Military Academy Sandhurst
Gurkha Demonstration Company (Sittang)
44 Support Squadron, Royal Logistic Corps
Army Officer Selection Board, at Leighton House, Westbury
University Officer Training Corps
Junior Staff Centre (Warminster)

Army Adventurous Training Group
 HQ army adventurous training group, Upavon
 Joint service mountain training centre, Anglesey
 The army adventurous training centre, Upavon
 Joint service mountain training wing, Ballachulish
 Joint service mountain training wing, Halton
 Joint service mountain training wing Indefatigable, Anglesey
 Joint service mountain training wing, Bavaria
 Joint service mountain training wing, Llanrwst
 Joint service mountain training wing, Inverness
 Adventurous training foundation wing, Castlemartin
 Adventurous training foundation wing, Harz
 Joint service parachute wing, Netheravon
 Joint service adventurous training wing, Cyprus

British Army Training and Support Unit Belize
Headquarters, British Army Training and Support Unit Belize, at Price Barracks
No permanent units, after being mothballed in the Strategic Defence and Security Review 2010, however it was re-established in the 2015 SDSR

British Army Germany
British Army Germany, Sennelager
Land Training Fleet (Sennelager), at Athlone Barracks, Sennelager
British Army (Germany) Maintenance Detachment, at Ayrshire Barracks South, Mönchengladbach
Dorsten Ammunition Depot
Alpine Training Centre Hubertushaus, in Oberstdorf

Order of precedence

The British Army parades according to the order of precedence, from right to left, with the unit at the extreme right being highest on the order. The Household Cavalry has the highest precedence, unless the Royal Horse Artillery parades with its guns.

British Army units in other areas of the British Armed Forces

Strategic Command 

 Defence Intelligence, in London
 42 Engineer Regiment (Geographic), Royal Engineers, at RAF Wyton (Geographical Support)
 British Forces Cyprus
 1st Battalion, Duke of Lancaster's Regiment (King's, Lancashire and Border) (will re-join 4 BCT in 2024)
 1st Battalion, Royal Anglian Regiment (will join 11 Brigade in 2023)
 British Forces Gibraltar
 Royal Gibraltar Regiment, in Gibraltar (Light Infantry)
 United Kingdom Special Forces
 21 Special Air Service
 22 Special Air Service
 23 Special Air Service
 Special Reconnaissance Regiment
 Special Forces Support Group
 18 (UKSF) Signal Regiment

Navy Command 

 3 Commando Brigade
 29 Commando Regiment, Royal Artillery, in Plymouth (Commando Artillery)
 24 Commando Regiment, Royal Engineers, in Chivenor (Commando Engineers)

Air Command 

 22 Group, Defence College of Technical Training (DCTT)
 11 Signal Regiment, Royal Corps of Signals, Defence School of Communications and Information Systems at Blandford Camp
 8 Training Battalion, Royal Electrical and Mechanical Engineers,  Defence School of Electronic and Mechanical Engineering (DSEME) at  MoD Lyneham

Notes

References and sources
Sources
A Guide to Appointments and Invitations for Defence Staffs within High Commissions and Embassies in London, UK Ministry of Defence, June 2005 edition

Citations

External links
British Army Corps, Regiment Units — at www.army.mod.uk
British Monarchy and the British Army — at www.royal.gov.uk
UK operations: the defence contribution to resilience and security — at www.gov.uk
Future Soldier Guide

 
British Army